Leavens is a surname. Notable people with the surname include:

Bert Leavens (1886–1953), Canadian politician in Ontario
Edmund Leavens Chandler (1829–1880), Canadian politician in Quebec
Gary T. Leavens, American professor of computer science
Henry Leavens (1836–1917), American politician in Wisconsin